Kim Il-sung (born Kim Song-ju, ; 15 April 1912 – 8 July 1994) was a Korean politician and the founder of North Korea, which he ruled from the country's establishment in 1948 until his death in 1994. He held the posts of Premier from 1948 to 1972 and President from 1972 to 1994. He was the leader of the Workers' Party of Korea (WPK) from 1949 to 1994 (titled as Chairman from 1949 to 1966 and as General Secretary after 1966). Coming to power after the end of Japanese rule in 1945, he authorized the invasion of South Korea in 1950, triggering an intervention in defense of South Korea by the United Nations led by the United States. Following the military stalemate in the Korean War, a ceasefire was signed on 27 July 1953. He was the third longest-serving non-royal head of state/government in the 20th century, in office for more than 45 years.

Under his leadership, North Korea was established as a socialist state with a centrally planned economy. It had close political and economic relations with the Soviet Union. By the late 1950s and during the 1960s and 1970s, North Korea enjoyed a higher standard of living than the South, which was suffering from political chaos and economic crises. The situation was reversed in the 1980s, as a newly stable South Korea became an economic powerhouse which was fueled by Japanese and American investment, military aid and internal economic development, while North Korea stagnated and then declined during the same period. Differences emerged between North Korea and the Soviet Union; chief among them was Kim Il-sung's philosophy of Juche, which focused on Korean nationalism, self-reliance and socialism. Despite this, the country received funds, subsidies and aid from the USSR and the Eastern Bloc until the dissolution of the USSR in 1991. The resulting loss of economic aid adversely affected the North's economy, contributing to widespread famine in 1994. During this period, North Korea also remained critical of the United States defense force's presence in the region, which it considered imperialist, having seized the American ship USS Pueblo in 1968, which was part of an infiltration and subversion campaign to reunify the peninsula under North Korea's rule. Kim outlived his allies Joseph Stalin by four decades and Mao Zedong by almost two decades, and remained in power during the terms of office of six South Korean Presidents and ten US Presidents. Known as the Great Leader (Suryong), he established a personality cult which dominates domestic politics in North Korea.

At the 6th WPK Congress in 1980, his oldest son Kim Jong-il was elected to be a Presidium member and chosen to be his successor. Kim Il-sung's birthday is a public holiday in North Korea called the "Day of the Sun". In 1998, four years after his death, Kim Il-sung was declared "eternal President of the Republic".

Early life

Family background 

Kim was born to Kim Hyong-jik and Kang Pan-sok, who gave him the name Kim Song-ju. Kim had two younger brothers, Kim Ch'ol-chu (or Kim Chul-ju) and Kim Yong-ju.

Kim's family is said to have originated from Jeonju, North Jeolla Province. His great-grandfather, Kim Ung-u, settled in Mangyongdae in 1860. Kim was reportedly born in the small village of Mangyungbong (then called Namni) near Pyongyang on 15 April 1912. According to a 1964 semi-official biography of Kim, he was born in his mother's home in Chingjong, and later grew up in Mangyungbong.

According to Kim, his family was not impoverished, but was always a step away from being so. Kim said that he was raised in a Presbyterian family, that his maternal grandfather was a Protestant minister, that his father had gone to a missionary school and was an elder in the Presbyterian Church, and that his parents were very active in the religious community. According to an official North Korean government account, Kim's family participated in anti-Japanese activities and in 1920, they fled to Manchuria. Like most Korean families, they resented Japanese occupation of the Korean peninsula (which had begun on 29 August 1910).  Japanese repression of Korean opposition was harsh, resulting in the arrest and detention of more than 52,000 Korean citizens in 1912 alone. This repression had forced many Korean families to flee the Korean peninsula, and settle in Manchuria.

Nonetheless, Kim's parents, especially Kim's mother Kang Ban-suk, played a role in the anti-Japanese struggle that was sweeping the peninsula. Their exact involvement—whether their cause was missionary, nationalist, or both—is unclear.

Communist and guerrilla activities 

In October 1926, Kim founded the Down-with-Imperialism Union. He attended Whasung Military Academy in 1926, but finding the academy's training methods outdated, quit in 1927. He then attended Yuwen Middle School in China's Jilin province until 1930, when he rejected the feudal traditions of older-generation Koreans and became interested in communist ideologies. Kim's formal education ended when the police arrested and jailed him for his subversive activities. At seventeen, Kim had become the youngest member of an underground Marxist organization with fewer than twenty members, led by Hŏ So, who belonged to the South Manchurian Communist Youth Association. The police discovered the group three weeks after it formed in 1929, and jailed Kim for several months.

In 1931, Kim joined the Chinese Communist Party—the Communist Party of Korea had been founded in 1925, but had been thrown out of the Comintern in the early 1930s for being too nationalist. He joined various anti-Japanese guerrilla groups in northern China. Feelings against the Japanese ran high in Manchuria, but as of May 1930 the Japanese had not yet occupied Manchuria. On 30 May 1930, a spontaneous violent uprising in eastern Manchuria arose in which peasants attacked some local villages in the name of resisting "Japanese aggression." The authorities easily suppressed this unplanned, reckless and unfocused uprising. Because of the attack, the Japanese began to plan an occupation of Manchuria. In a speech Kim allegedly made before a meeting of Young Communist League delegates on 20 May 1931 in Yenchi County in Manchuria, he warned the delegates against such unplanned uprisings as the 30 May 1930 uprising in eastern Manchuria.

Four months later, on 18 September 1931, the "Mukden Incident" occurred, in which a relatively weak dynamite explosive charge went off near a Japanese railroad in the town of Mukden in Manchuria. Although no damage occurred, the Japanese used the incident as an excuse to send armed forces into Manchuria and to appoint a puppet government. In 1935, Kim became a member of the Northeast Anti-Japanese United Army, a guerrilla group led by the Chinese Communist Party. Kim was appointed the same year to serve as political commissar for the 3rd detachment of the second division, consisting of around 160 soldiers. Here Kim met the man who would become his mentor as a communist, Wei Zhengmin, Kim's immediate superior officer, who served at the time as chairman of the Political Committee of the Northeast Anti-Japanese United Army. Wei reported directly to Kang Sheng, a high-ranking party member close to Mao Zedong in Yan'an, until Wei's death on 8 March 1941.

Kim's actions during the Minsaengdan incident helped solidify his leadership. Chinese communists operating in Manchuria had become suspicious that any Korean could secretly be a member of the pro-Japanese and anti-communist Minsaengdan. A purge resulted: over 1,000 Koreans were expelled from the Communist Party of China, including Kim (who was arrested in late 1933 and exonerated in early 1934), and 500 were killed. Kim Il-sung's memoirs - and those of the guerillas who fought alongside him – cite Kim's seizing and burning the suspect files of the Purge Committee as key to solidifying his leadership. After the destruction of the suspect files and the rehabilitation of suspects, those who had fled the purge rallied around Kim. As historian Suzy Kim summarizes, Kim Il-sung "emerged from the purge as a definitive leader, not only for the bold move but also for his compassion."

In 1935, Kim took the name Kim Il-sung, meaning "Kim become the sun". Kim was appointed commander of the 6th division in 1937, at the age of 24, controlling a few hundred men in a group that came to be known as "Kim Il-sung's division". On 4 June 1937, he led 200 guerillas in a raid on Poch'onbo, destroying the local government offices and setting fire to a Japanese police station and post office. The success of the raid demonstrated Kim's talents as a military leader. Even more significant than the military success itself was the political coordination and organization between the guerillas and the Korean Fatherland Restoration Association, an anti-Japanese united front group based in Manchuria. These accomplishment would grant Kim some measure of fame among Chinese guerrillas, and North Korean biographies would later exploit it as a great victory for Korea.

For their part, the Japanese regarded Kim as one of the most effective and popular Korean guerrilla leaders. He appeared on Japanese wanted lists as the "Tiger". The Japanese "Maeda Unit" was sent to hunt him in February 1940. Later in 1940, the Japanese kidnapped a woman named Kim Hye-sun, believed to have been Kim Il-Sung's first wife. After using her as a hostage to try to convince the Korean guerrillas to surrender, she was killed. Kim was appointed commander of the 2nd operational region for the 1st Army, but by the end of 1940 he was the only 1st Army leader still alive. Pursued by Japanese troops, Kim and what remained of his army escaped by crossing the Amur River into the Soviet Union. Kim was sent to a camp at Vyatskoye near Khabarovsk, where the Soviets retrained the Korean communist guerrillas. In August 1942, Kim and his army were assigned to a special unit known as the 88th Separate Rifle Brigade, which belonged to the Soviet Red Army. Kim's immediate superior was Zhou Baozhong. Kim became a Major in the Soviet Red Army and served in it until the end of World War II in 1945.

Return to Korea 

The Soviet Union declared war on Japan on 8 August 1945, and the Red Army entered Pyongyang on 24 August 1945. Stalin had instructed Lavrentiy Beria to recommend a communist leader for the Soviet-occupied territories and Beria met Kim several times before recommending him to Stalin.

Kim arrived in the Korean port of Wonsan on 19 September 1945 after 26 years in exile. According to Leonid Vassin, an officer with the Soviet MVD, Kim was essentially "created from zero". For one, his Korean was marginal at best; he only had eight years of formal education, all of it in Chinese. He needed considerable coaching to read a speech (which the MVD prepared for him) at a Communist Party congress three days after he arrived.

In December 1945, the Soviets installed Kim as First Secretary of the North Korean Branch Bureau of the Korean Communist Party. Originally, the Soviets preferred Cho Man-sik to lead a popular front government, but Cho refused to support a UN-backed trusteeship and clashed with Kim. General Terentii Shtykov, who led the Soviet occupation of northern Korea, supported Kim over Pak Hon-yong to lead the Provisional People's Committee for North Korea on 8 February 1946. As chairman of the committee, Kim was "the top Korean administrative leader in the North," though he was still de facto subordinate to General Shtykov until the Chinese intervention in the Korean War.

To solidify his control, Kim established the Korean People's Army (KPA), aligned with the Communist Party, and he recruited a cadre of guerrillas and former soldiers who had gained combat experience in battles against the Japanese and later against Nationalist Chinese troops. Using Soviet advisers and equipment, Kim constructed a large army skilled in infiltration tactics and guerrilla warfare. Prior to Kim's invasion of the South in 1950, which triggered the Korean War, Stalin equipped the KPA with modern, Soviet-built medium tanks, trucks, artillery, and small arms. Kim also formed an air force, equipped at first with Soviet-built propeller-driven fighters and attack aircraft. Later, North Korean pilot candidates were sent to the Soviet Union and China to train in MiG-15 jet aircraft at secret bases.

Claims that Kim Il-sung was an imposter 

Several sources claim the name "Kim Il-sung" had previously been used by a prominent early leader of the Korean resistance, Kim Kyung-cheon. The Soviet officer Grigory Mekler, who worked with Kim during the Soviet occupation, said that Kim took this name from a former commander who had died. However, historian Andrei Lankov has argued that this is unlikely to be true. Several witnesses knew Kim before and after his time in the Soviet Union, including his superior, Zhou Baozhong, who dismissed the claim of a "second" Kim in his diaries. Historian Bruce Cumings pointed out that Japanese officers from the Kwantung Army have attested to his fame as a resistance figure. 

According to the 2019 book Surprise, Kill, Vanish by investigative journalist Annie Jacobsen, the United States Central Intelligence Agency (CIA) once concluded that Kim Il-sung was a blackmailed imposter operated by the Soviet Union. The dossier titled "The Identity of Kim Il-Sung" ascribed the leader's true identity to Kim Song-ju, an orphaned child caught stealing money from a classmate who killed his classmate to avoid embarrassment. The dossier alleges Soviet intelligence officers identified the opportunity to blackmail Kim Song-ju into leading the North Korean Communist Party as a Soviet puppet under the name of the real war hero Kim-Il Sung, whom Stalin had disappeared. Jacobsen also writes that the CIA learned "specific instructions [were] given to the leaders of the regime that there should be no questions raised about Kim [Il Sung]'s identity."

Historians generally accept the view that, while Kim's exploits were exaggerated by the personality cult which was built around him, he was a significant guerrilla leader.

Leader of North Korea

Early years 

Despite United Nations plans to conduct all-Korean elections, the Soviets held elections of their own in their zone on 25 August 1948 for a Supreme People's Assembly. Voters were presented with a single list from the Communist-dominated Democratic Front for the Reunification of the Fatherland. The Democratic People's Republic of Korea was proclaimed on 9 September 1948, with Kim as the Soviet-designated premier. On 15 August 1948, the south had declared statehood as the Republic of Korea. The Communist Party was nominally led by Kim Tu-bong, though from the outset Kim Il-sung held the real power.

On 12 October, the Soviet Union recognized Kim's government as the sovereign government of the entire peninsula, including the south. The Communist Party merged with the New People's Party of Korea to form the Workers' Party of North Korea, with Kim as vice-chairman. In 1949, the Workers' Party of North Korea merged with its southern counterpart to become the Workers' Party of Korea (WPK) with Kim as party chairman.
By 1949, Kim and the communists had consolidated their rule in North Korea. Around this time, Kim began promoting an intense personality cult. The first of many statues of him appeared, and he began calling himself "Great Leader".

In February 1946, Kim Il-sung decided to introduce a number of reforms. Over 50% of the arable land was redistributed, an 8-hour work day was proclaimed and all heavy industry was to be nationalized. There were improvements in the health of the population after he nationalized healthcare and made it available to all citizens.

Korean War 

Archival material suggests that North Korea's decision to invade South Korea was Kim's initiative, not a Soviet one. Evidence suggests that Soviet intelligence, through its espionage sources in the US government and British SIS, had obtained information on the limitations of US atomic bomb stockpiles as well as defense program cuts, leading Stalin to conclude that the Truman administration would not intervene in Korea.

China acquiesced only reluctantly to the idea of Korean reunification after being told by Kim that Stalin had approved the action. The Chinese did not provide North Korea with direct military support (other than logistics channels) until United Nations troops, largely US forces, had nearly reached the Yalu River late in 1950. At the outset of the war in June and July, North Korean forces captured Seoul and occupied most of the South, save for a small section of territory in the southeast region of the South that was called the Pusan Perimeter. But in September, the North Koreans were driven back by the US-led counterattack that started with the UN landing in Incheon, followed by a combined South Korean-US-UN offensive from the Pusan Perimeter. By October, UN forces had retaken Seoul and invaded the North to reunify the country under the South. On 19 October, US and South Korean troops captured P'yŏngyang, forcing Kim and his government to flee north, first to Sinuiju and eventually into Kanggye.

On 25 October 1950, after sending various warnings of their intent to intervene if UN forces did not halt their advance, Chinese troops in the thousands crossed the Yalu River and entered the war as allies of the KPA. There were nevertheless tensions between Kim and the Chinese government. Kim had been warned of the likelihood of an amphibious landing at Incheon, which was ignored. There was also a sense that the North Koreans had paid little in war compared to the Chinese who had fought for their country for decades against foes with better technology. The UN troops were forced to withdraw and Chinese troops retook P'yŏngyang in December and Seoul in January 1951. In March, UN forces began a new offensive, retaking Seoul and advanced north once again halting at a point just north of the 38th Parallel. After a series of offensives and counter-offensives by both sides, followed by a grueling period of largely static trench warfare that lasted from the summer of 1951 to July 1953, the front was stabilized along what eventually became the permanent "Armistice Line" of 27 July 1953. Over 2.5 million people died during the Korean War.

Chinese and Russian documents from that time reveal that Kim became increasingly desperate to establish a truce, since the likelihood that further fighting would successfully unify Korea under his rule became more remote with the UN and US presence. Kim also resented the Chinese taking over the majority of the fighting in his country, with Chinese forces stationed at the center of the front line, and the Korean People's Army being mostly restricted to the coastal flanks of the front.

Consolidating power 

With the end of the Korean War, despite the failure to unify Korea under his rule, Kim Il-sung proclaimed the war a victory in the sense that he had remained in power in the north. However, the three-year war left North Korea devastated, and Kim immediately embarked on a large reconstruction effort. He launched a five-year national economic plan (akin to Soviet Union's five-year plans) to establish a command economy, with all industry owned by the state and all agriculture collectivized. The economy was focused on heavy industry and arms production. By the 1960s, North Korea briefly enjoyed a standard of living higher than the South, which was fraught with political instability and economic crises. Both South and North Korea retained huge armed forces to defend the 1953 Demilitarized Zone, and US forces remained in the South.

In the ensuing years, Kim established himself as an independent leader of international communism. In 1956, he joined Mao in the "anti-revisionist" camp, which did not accept Nikita Khrushchev's program of de-Stalinization, yet he did not become a Maoist himself. At the same time, he consolidated his power over the Korean communist movement. Rival leaders were eliminated. Pak Hon-yong, leader of the Korean Communist Party, was purged and executed in 1955. Choe Chang-ik appears to have been purged as well. Yi Sang-Cho, North Korea's ambassador to the Soviet Union and a critic of Kim who defected to the Soviet Union in 1956, was declared a factionalist and a traitor. The 1955 Juche speech, which stressed Korean independence, debuted in the context of Kim's power struggle against leaders such as Pak, who had Soviet backing. This was little noticed at the time until state media started talking about it in 1963. Kim developed the policy and ideology of Juche in opposition to the idea of North Korea as a satellite state of China or the Soviet Union.

Kim transformed North Korea into what is considered by Wonjun Song and Joseph Wright as a personalist dictatorship, where power was centralized in Kim personally. Kim Il-sung's cult of personality had initially been criticized by some members of the government. The North Korean ambassador to the USSR, Li Sangjo, a member of the Yan'an faction, reported that it had become a criminal offense to so much as write on Kim's picture in a newspaper and that he had been elevated to the status of Marx, Lenin, Mao, and Stalin in the communist pantheon. He also charged Kim with rewriting history so it would appear as if his guerrilla faction had single-handedly liberated Korea from the Japanese, completely ignoring the assistance of the Chinese People's Volunteers. In addition, Li stated that in the process of agricultural collectivization, grain was being forcibly confiscated from the peasants, leading to "at least 300 suicides" and he also stated that Kim made nearly all major policy decisions and appointments himself. Li reported that over 30,000 people were in prison for completely unjust and arbitrary reasons which were as trivial as not printing Kim Il-sung's portrait on sufficient quality paper or using newspapers with his picture to wrap parcels. Grain confiscation and tax collection were also conducted with force, which consisted of violence, beatings, and threats of imprisonment.

During the 1956 August Faction Incident, Kim Il-sung successfully resisted Soviet and Chinese efforts to depose him in favor of pro-Soviet Koreans or Koreans who belonged to the pro-Chinese Yan'an faction. The last Chinese troops withdrew from the country in October 1958, which is the consensus as the latest date when North Korea became effectively independent, though some scholars believe that the 1956 August incident demonstrated North Korea's independence.

During his rise and consolidation of power, Kim created the songbun caste system, which divided the North Korean people into three groups. Each person was classified as belonging to the "core," "wavering," or "hostile" class, based on his or her political, social, and economic background – a system which persists today. Songbun was used to decide all aspects of a person's existence in North Korean society, including access to education, housing, employment, food rationing, ability to join the ruling party, and even where a person was allowed to live. Large numbers of people from the so-called hostile class, which included intellectuals, land owners, and former supporters of Japan's occupying government during World War II, were forcibly relocated to the country's isolated and impoverished northern provinces. When years of famine ravaged the country in the 1990s, those people who lived in its marginalized and remote communities were hardest hit.

During his rule, North Korea was responsible for widespread human rights abuses. Kim Il-Sung punished real and perceived dissent through purges which included public executions and enforced disappearances. Not only dissenters but their entire extended families were reduced to the lowest songbun rank, and many of them were relocated to a secret system of political prison camps. These camps or kwanliso, a part of Kim's vast network of abusive penal and forced labor institutions, were fenced and heavily guarded colonies in mountainous areas of the country, where prisoners were forced to perform back-breaking labor such as logging, mining, and picking crops. Most prisoners were held in these camps for life, and their living and working conditions in them were often deadly. For example, prisoners were nearly starved to death, denied medical care, denied proper housing and clothes, subjected to sexual violence, regularly mistreated, tortured and executed by guards.

Later rule 

Despite his opposition to de-Stalinization, Kim never officially severed relations with the Soviet Union, and he did not take part in the Sino-Soviet Split. After Khrushchev was replaced by Leonid Brezhnev in 1964, Kim's relations with the Soviet Union became closer. At the same time, Kim was increasingly alienated by Mao's unstable style of leadership, especially during the Cultural Revolution in the late 1960s. Kim in turn was denounced by Mao's Red Guards. At the same time, Kim reinstated relations with most of Eastern Europe's communist countries, primarily with Erich Honecker's East Germany and Nicolae Ceaușescu's Romania. Ceauşescu was heavily influenced by Kim's ideology, and the personality cult which grew around him in Romania was very similar to that of Kim.

In the 1960s, Kim became impressed with the efforts of North Vietnamese Leader Ho Chi Minh to reunify Vietnam through guerrilla warfare and thought that something similar might be possible in Korea. Infiltration and subversion efforts were thus greatly stepped up against US forces and the leadership in South Korea. These efforts culminated in an attempt to storm the Blue House and assassinate President Park Chung-hee. North Korean troops thus took a much more aggressive stance toward US forces in and around South Korea, engaging US Army troops in fire-fights along the Demilitarized Zone. The 1968 capture of the crew of the spy ship USS Pueblo was a part of this campaign.

Albania's Enver Hoxha (another independent-minded communist leader) was a fierce enemy of the country and Kim Il-sung, writing in June 1977 that "genuine Marxist-Leninists" will understand that the "ideology which is guiding the Korean Workers' Party and the Communist Party of China ... is revisionist" and later that month he added that "in Pyongyang, I believe that even Tito will be astonished at the proportions of the cult of his host [Kim Il-sung], which has reached a level unheard of anywhere else, either in past or present times, let alone in a country which calls itself socialist." He further claimed that "the leadership of the Communist Party of China has betrayed [the working people]. In Korea, too, we can say that the leadership of the Korean Workers' Party is wallowing in the same waters" and claimed that Kim Il-sung was begging for aid from other countries, especially among the Eastern Bloc and non-aligned countries like Yugoslavia. As a result, relations between North Korea and Albania would remain cold and tense right up until Hoxha's death in 1985.

Although a resolute anti-communist, Zaire's Mobutu Sese Seko was also heavily influenced by Kim's style of rule.

The North Korean government's practice of abducting foreign nationals, such as South Koreans, Japanese, Chinese, Thais, and Romanians, is another practice of Kim Il-Sung which persists to the present day. Kim Il-Sung planned these operations to seize persons who could be used to support North Korea's overseas intelligence operations, or those who had technical skills to maintain the socialist state's economic infrastructure in farms, construction, hospitals, and heavy industry. According to the Korean War Abductees Family Union (KWAFU), those abducted by North Korea after the war included 2,919 civil servants, 1,613 police, 190 judicial officers and lawyers, and 424 medical practitioners. In the hijacking and seizure of Korean Airlines flight YS-11 in 1969 by North Korean agents, the pilots and mechanics, and others with specialized skills, were the only ones never permitted to return to South Korea. The total number of foreign abductees and disappeared is still unknown, but is estimated to include more than 200,000 people. The vast majority of disappearances occurred or were linked to the Korean War, but hundreds of South Koreans and Japanese people were abducted between the 1960s and 1980s. A number of South Koreans and nationals of the People's Republic of China have also been apparently abducted in the 2000s and 2010s. At least 100,000 people remain disappeared.

A new constitution was proclaimed in December 1972, which created an executive presidency. Kim gave up the premiership and was elected president. On 14 April 1975, North Korea discontinued most formal use of its traditional units and adopted the metric system. In 1980, he decided that his son Kim Jong-il would succeed him, and increasingly delegated the running of the government to him. The Kim family was supported by the army, due to Kim Il-sung's revolutionary record and the support of the veteran defense minister, O Chin-u. At the Sixth Party Congress in October 1980, Kim publicly designated his son as his successor. In 1986, a rumor spread that Kim had been assassinated, making the concern for Jong-il's ability to succeed his father actual. Kim dispelled the rumors, however, by making a series of public appearances. It has been argued, however, that the incident helped establish the order of succession—the first apparent patrilineal in a communist state—which eventually would occur upon Kim Il-Sung's death in 1994.

From about this time, North Korea encountered increasing economic difficulties. South Korea became an economic powerhouse fueled by Japanese and American investment, military aid, and internal economic development, while North Korea stagnated and then declined in the 1980s. The practical effect of Juche was to cut the country off from virtually all foreign trade in order to make it entirely self-reliant. The economic reforms of Deng Xiaoping in China from 1979 onward meant that trade with the moribund economy of North Korea held decreasing interest for China. The Revolutions of 1989 in Eastern Europe and the dissolution of the Soviet Union, from 1989 to 1992, completed North Korea's virtual isolation. These events led to mounting economic difficulties because Kim refused to issue any economic or political reforms.

As he aged, starting in the 1970s, Kim developed a calcium deposit growth on the right side of the back of his neck. It was long believed that its close proximity to his brain and spinal cord made it inoperable. However, Juan Reynaldo Sanchez, a defected bodyguard for Fidel Castro who met Kim in 1986 wrote later that it was Kim's own paranoia that prevented it from being operated on. Because of its unappealing nature, North Korean reporters and photographers were required to photograph Kim while standing slightly to his left in order to hide the growth from official photographs and newsreels. Hiding the growth became increasingly difficult as the growth reached the size of a baseball by the late 1980s.

To ensure a full succession of leadership to his son and designated successor Kim Jong-il, Kim turned over his chairmanship of North Korea's National Defense Commission—the body mainly responsible for control of the armed forces as well as the supreme commandership of the country's now million-man strong military force, the Korean People's Army—to his son in 1991 and 1993. So far, the elder Kim—even though he is dead—has remained the country's president and the chairman of the Party's Central Military Commission, the party's organization that has supreme supervision and authority over military matters.

In early 1994, Kim began investing in nuclear power to offset energy shortages brought on by economic problems. This was the first of many "nuclear crises". On 19 May 1994, Kim ordered spent fuel to be unloaded from the already disputed nuclear research facility in Yongbyon. Despite repeated chiding from Western nations, Kim continued to conduct nuclear research and carry on with the uranium enrichment program. In June 1994, former US President Jimmy Carter travelled to Pyongyang in an effort to persuade Kim to negotiate with the Clinton administration over its nuclear program. To the astonishment of the United States and the International Atomic Energy Agency, Kim agreed to halt his nuclear research program and seemed to be embarking upon a new opening to the West.

Death 

On the late morning shortly before 12:00 noon on 7 July 1994, Kim Il-sung collapsed from a sudden heart attack at his residence in Hyangsan, North Pyongan. After the heart attack, Kim Jong-il ordered the team of doctors who were constantly at his father's side to leave, and arranged for the country's best doctors to be flown in from Pyongyang. After several hours, the doctors from Pyongyang arrived, but despite their efforts to save him, Kim Il-sung died at 2:00am on 8 July 1994 at age 82. After the traditional Confucian mourning period, his death was declared 34 hours later.

Kim Il-sung's death resulted in nationwide mourning and a ten-day mourning period was declared by Kim Jong-il. His funeral was scheduled to be held on 17 July 1994 in Pyongyang but was delayed until 19 July. It was attended by hundreds of thousands of people who were flown into the city from all over North Korea. Kim Il-sung's body was placed in a public mausoleum at the Kumsusan Palace of the Sun, where his preserved and embalmed body lies under a glass coffin for viewing purposes. His head rests on a traditional Korean pillow and he is covered by the flag of the Workers' Party of Korea. Newsreel video of the funeral at Pyongyang was broadcast on several networks, and can now be found on various websites.

Contributions to political theory 

Kim Il-sung's most notable contribution to political theory is his conceptualization of the Juche idea, originally described as a variant of Marxism–Leninism.

In his writings, Kim engaged with Karl Marx's metaphor that religion is the opium of the people. He did so both in the context of responding to his comrades who objected to working with religious groups (Chonbulygo and Chondoism, respectively). In the first instance, Kim replies that a person is "mistaken" if he or she believes Marx's proposition regarding "opium of the people" can be applied in all instances, explaining that if a religion "prays for dealing out divine punishment to Japan and blessing the Korean nation" then it is a "patriotic religion" and its believers are patriots. In the second, Kim states that Marx's metaphor "must not be construed radically and unilaterally" because Marx was warning against "the temptation of a religious mirage and not opposing believers in general." Because the communist movement in Korea was fighting a struggle for "national salvation" against Japan, Kim writes that anyone with a similar agenda can join the struggle and that "even a religionist ... must be enrolled in our ranks without hesitation."

Personal life 

Kim Il-sung married twice. His first wife, Kim Jong-suk (1917–1949), gave birth to two sons and one daughter before her death in childbirth during the delivery of a stillborn girl. Kim Jong-il was his oldest son. The other son (Kim Man-il, or Shaura Kim) of this marriage died in 1947 in a swimming accident. A daughter, Kim Kyong-hui, was born in 1946.

Kim married Kim Song-ae (1924–2014) in 1952, and it is believed that he had three children with her: Kim Yŏng-il (not to be confused with the former Premier of North Korea with the same name), Kim Kyŏng-il, and Kim Pyong-il. Kim Pyong-il was prominent in Korean politics until he became ambassador to Hungary. In 2015, Kim Pyong-il became ambassador to the Czech Republic, but officially retired in 2019 and resides once again in North Korea.

Kim was reported to have had other children with women who he was not married to. They included Kim Hyŏn-nam (born 1972, head of the Propaganda and Agitation Department of the Workers' Party since 2002).

Awards 

According to North Korean sources, Kim Il-sung had received 230 foreign orders, medals and titles from 70 countries since the 1940s until, and after, his death. They include: The Soviet Order of the Red Banner and the Order of Lenin (twice), Star of the Republic of Indonesia (first class), the Bulgarian Order of Georgi Dimitrov (twice), the Togolese Order of Mono (Grand Cross), the Order of the Yugoslav Star (Great Star), the Cuban Order of José Martí (twice), the East German Order of Karl Marx (twice), the Maltese Xirka Ġieħ ir-Repubblika, the Burkinabe Order of the Gold Star of Nahouri, Order of the Grand Star of Honour of Socialist Ethiopia, the Nicaraguan , the Vietnamese Gold Star Order, the Czechoslovak Order of Klement Gottwald, the Royal Order of Cambodia (Grand Cross), the National Order of Madagascar (first class, Grand Cross), the Mongolian Order of Sukhbaatar, and the Romanian orders of Order of Victory of Socialism and Order of the Star of the Romanian Socialist Republic (first class with band).

Legacy 

Kim Il-sung was revered as a godlike figure within North Korea during his lifetime, but his personality cult struggled to extend beyond the country's borders. There are over 500 statues of him in North Korea, similar to the many statues and monuments that Eastern Bloc countries erected of their leaders. The most prominent are at Kim Il-sung University, Kim Il-sung Stadium, Mansudae Hill, Kim Il-sung Bridge and the Immortal Statue of Kim Il-sung. Some statues have reportedly been destroyed by explosions or damaged with graffiti by North Korean dissidents. Yŏng Saeng ("eternal life") monuments have been erected throughout the country, each dedicated to the departed "Eternal Leader".

Kim Il-sung's image is prominent in places associated with public transportation, especially his posthumous portrait released in 1994, which hangs at every North Korean train station and airport. It is also placed prominently near the border crossings between China and North Korea. At the border outside of Yanji, South Korean tourists could pay the local Chinese residents for a picture taken against the scenery of North Korea beyond the Tumen River, with the portrait of Kim Il-sung looming large at the background.

Thousands of gifts to Kim Il-sung from foreign leaders are housed in the International Friendship Exhibition.

Kim Il-sung's birthday, "Day of the Sun", is celebrated every year as a public holiday in North Korea. The associated April Spring Friendship Art Festival gathers hundreds of artists from all over the world.

There is a Kim Il-sung Park, a Kim Il-sung Alley, and a Kim Il-sung monument in Damascus, Syria.

Works

Kim Il-sung was the author of many works. According to North Korean sources, these amount to approximately 10,800 speeches, reports, books, treatises, and others. Some, such as the 100-volume Complete Collection of Kim Il-sung's Works, are published by the Workers' Party of Korea Publishing House. Shortly before his death, he published an eight-volume autobiography, With the Century.

According to official North Korean sources, Kim Il-sung was the original writer of many plays and operas. One of these, a revolutionary theatrical opera called The Flower Girl, was adapted into a locally produced feature film in 1972.

See also 

Kimilsungia
Kim Tu-bong
Residences of North Korean leaders
"Song of General Kim Il-sung"
List of things named after Kim Il-sung
Korean independence movement
Jeongju Gim (Kim)
Communism in Korea

Notes

References

Further reading 
 Baik Bong, "From Birth to Triumphant Return to Homeland," "From Building Democratic Korea to Chollima Flight," and "From Independent National Economy to 10-Point Political Programme".
 Blair, Clay, The Forgotten War: America in Korea, Naval Institute Press (2003).
 Kracht, Christian, The Ministry Of Truth: Kim Jong Il's North Korea, Feral House, October 2007, 132 pages, 88 color photographs, .
 Lee Chong-Sik. "Kim Il-Song of North Korea." Asian Survey. University of California Press. Vol. 7, No. 6, June 1967. DOI 10.2307/2642612. Available at Jstor.
 NKIDP: Crisis and Confrontation on the Korean Peninsula: 1968–1969, A Critical Oral History
 Sudoplatov, Pavel Anatoli, Schecter, Jerrold L., and Schecter, Leona P., Special Tasks: The Memoirs of an Unwanted Witness—A Soviet Spymaster, Little Brown, Boston (1994).
 Szalontai, Balázs, Kim Il Sung in the Khrushchev Era: Soviet-DPRK Relations and the Roots of North Korean Despotism, 1953–1964. Stanford: Stanford University Press; Washington, D.C.: Woodrow Wilson Center Press (2005).

External links 

 Nicolae Ceausescu's visit to Pyongyang, North Korea, in 1971
 "Conversations with Kim Il Sung" at the Wilson Center Digital Archive
 

 
1912 births
1994 deaths
20th-century North Korean writers
Anti-capitalists
Anti-Japanese sentiment in North Korea
Collars of the Order of the White Lion
Former Presbyterians
Generalissimos
Grand Crosses of the National Order of Mali
Grand Crosses of the Order of Merit of the Republic of Poland
Heads of state of North Korea
Korean communists
Korean expatriates in the Soviet Union
Korean independence activists
Korean nationalists
Korean revolutionaries
Kim Il-sung
Leaders of the Workers' Party of Korea and its predecessors
Members of the Presidium of the Workers' Party of Korea
Members of the 1st Central Committee of the Workers' Party of North Korea
Members of the 2nd Central Committee of the Workers' Party of Korea
Members of the 1st Political Committee of the Workers' Party of North Korea
Members of the 1st Standing Committee of the Workers' Party of North Korea
Members of the 2nd Political Committee of the Workers' Party of Korea
Members of the 2nd Standing Committee of the Workers' Party of Korea
Members of the 3rd Standing Committee of the Workers' Party of Korea
Members of the 4th Political Committee of the Workers' Party of Korea
Members of the 5th Political Committee of the Workers' Party of Korea
Members of the 6th Politburo of the Workers' Party of Korea
Members of the 6th Presidium of the Workers' Party of Korea
Members of the 3rd Central Committee of the Workers' Party of Korea
Members of the 4th Central Committee of the Workers' Party of Korea
Members of the 5th Central Committee of the Workers' Party of Korea
Members of the 6th Central Committee of the Workers' Party of Korea
Members of the 1st Supreme People's Assembly
Members of the 2nd Supreme People's Assembly
Members of the 3rd Supreme People's Assembly
Members of the 4th Supreme People's Assembly
Members of the 5th Supreme People's Assembly
Members of the 6th Supreme People's Assembly
Members of the 7th Supreme People's Assembly
Members of the 8th Supreme People's Assembly
Members of the 9th Supreme People's Assembly
National Heroes of North Korea
North Korean atheists
North Korean communists
North Korean people of the Korean War
North Korean writers
People from Pyongyang
People of 88th Separate Rifle Brigade
People of the Cold War
Politicide perpetrators
Prime Ministers of North Korea
Recipients of the Eduardo Mondlane Order
Recipients of the Order of Georgi Dimitrov
Recipients of the Order of Lenin
Recipients of the Order of Polonia Restituta (1944–1989)
Recipients of the Order of the Red Banner
Recipients of the Order of the Star of the Romanian Socialist Republic
Soviet military personnel of World War II
Stalinism
Vice Chairmen of the Workers' Party of Korea and its predecessors
World War II resistance members